Hilde Körber (3 July 1906 – 31 May 1969) was an Austrian film actress who worked largely in the German Film Industry. She appeared in 53 films between 1930 and 1964. She was born in Vienna, Austria-Hungary and died in West Berlin, West Germany.

She was the second wife of actor and director Veit Harlan, with whom she had three children including Thomas Harlan.

Selected filmography

 Chasing Fortune (1930)
 Maria the Maid (1936)
 My Son the Minister (1937)
 The Ruler (1937)
 Diamonds (1937)
 The Marriage Swindler (1938)
 Robert Koch (1939)
 Passion (1940)
 The Fox of Glenarvon (1940)
 The Great King (1942)
 Back Then (1943)
 Via Mala (1945)
 Morituri (1948)
 How Do We Tell Our Children? (1949)
 The Staircase (1950)
 When the Evening Bells Ring (1951)
 Desires (1952)
 Roses Bloom on the Moorland (1952)
 Life Begins at Seventeen (1953)
 Ave Maria (1953)
 Sauerbruch – Das war mein Leben (1954)
 The Confession of Ina Kahr (1954)
 Captain Wronski (1954)
 Island of the Dead (1955)
 Devil in Silk (1956)
 My Father, the Actor (1956)
 I'll Carry You in My Arms (1958)
 The Girl from the Marsh Croft (1958)

References

External links

1906 births
1969 deaths
Actresses from Vienna
20th-century Austrian actresses
Austrian film actresses